Yuri Petrovich Gaven (18 March 1884 – 4 October 1936), born Jānis Daumanis, was a Latvian revolutionary and Soviet politician and Chekist. He was a key figure in defeating of the Crimean People's Republic (with establishment of the so-called Taurida Soviet Socialist Republic) and an active participant in the Red Terror in Crimea.

Biography
Born as Jānis Daumanis in to a Latvian peasant family on 18 March 1884 at the hamlet of Bikern near Riga, in 1901 he graduated the Baltic Teacher Seminary becoming a people's teacher. The same year in 1901 Gaven joined the Russian Social Democratic Labour Party and until 1905 worked as a secretary of Riga's party organization. During the 1905 Revolution, he was a leader of militant formations of peasants in Livland Governorate and in 1906 he became a member of the Central Committee of the Social Democracy of Livland Krai. On 6 February 1908 Gaven was arrested and until the start of World War I (July 1914) he spent time in katorga centers of Riga and Vologda, after which Gaven was exiled to Minusinsk (at that time part of Yeniseysk Governorate).

After the February Revolution on 3 March 1917, Gaven was released and became a chairman of the local Minusinsk Communa at the same time he also was one of the organizers of the Congress of Soviets of the Middle Siberia. In September 1917 Gaven was delegated to the All-Russian Democratic Conference in Petrograd, after which at the end of September with Bolshevik mandate he was sent to Sevastopol. For some 11 days Gaven spent in Simferopol awaiting to be allowed in Sevastopol.

On 6–10 November 1917 Gaven was heading the so-called "First Black Sea Fleet Congress" in Sevastopol, which adopted Bolshevik resolution on power and sanctioned to send ships and sailors in fight against Alexey Kaledin. On 20 November 1917 Gaven was a delegate of the Governorate Congress of Soviets in Simferopol and the Bolshevik regional conference on 23–24 November 1917.

On the night of 15–16 December 1917 he was one of the leaders of an uprising of sailors which resulted in establishing of the Soviet regime in Sevastopol by creating the Sevastopol military revkom (Taurida milrevkom since 28 December 1917). Gaven was in charge of the arrests, tortures and mass shootings that accompanied the uprising. From December 18, Gaven headed the Presidium of Soviet of soldiers and workers deputies, the city's Bolshevik committee and was a chief editor of the newspaper "Tavricheskaya Pravda" (Taurida's Truth). He retired in 1933.

During the Stalinist purges Gaven was arrested in 1936 and accused of “counterrevolutionary” activities. Gaven was set to be tried, but being too sick to appear at his trial he was taken from his sickbed outside on a stretcher and shot dead on 4 October 1936.

References

Further reading
 Baranchenko, V. Gaven. 1967
 Encyclopedia of History of Ukraine. "Naukova Dumka" (Institute of History of Ukraine). Vol.2. Kiev, 2004. p. 10.

External links
Yuri Gaven at Hronos.
Yuri Gaven in the Great Soviet Encyclopedia
Yuri Gaven in the Handbook on history of the Communist Party and the Soviet Union 1898–1991.
Yuri Gaven in the book of Kir Bulychev, "Return from Trebizond".

1884 births
1936 deaths
Bolsheviks
Cheka
Communist Party of the Soviet Union members
Great Purge victims from Latvia
Latvian communists
Latvian exiles in the Russian Empire
Latvian revolutionaries
Politicians from Riga
People from the Governorate of Livonia
Soviet rehabilitations